Plzeň municipal election in 1994 was held as part of 1994 Czech municipal elections. It was held on 18 and 19 November 1994. It was the first election since dissolution of Czechoslovakia. The Civic Democratic Party has won the election. Zdeněk Prosek became the new Mayor when he replaced Zdeněk Mraček.

Background
Camapgin of ODS was formed centrally. The main motto was "Calmly and responsibly." ODS focused on privatisation during the campaign.

Results

Aftermath
ODS formed coalition with ODA and KDU-ČSL. Zdeněk prosek became the new Mayor.

References

External links
 Results

1994
1994 elections in Europe
1994 elections in the Czech Republic